Dale Darwin Smedsmo (born August 23, 1951) is an American former professional ice hockey forward.

Career 
Smedsmo played four games in the National Hockey League for the Toronto Maple Leafs and 110 games in the World Hockey Association with the New England Whalers, Cincinnati Stingers, and Indianapolis Racers between 1973 and 1978. Smedsmo played college hockey at Bemidji State University for the Bemidji State Beavers.

Personal life 
Smedsmo's stepson is Dustin Byfuglien, who also played in the NHL.

Career statistics

Regular season and playoffs

See also
 List of family relations in the NHL

References

External links
 

1951 births
Living people
People from Roseau, Minnesota
American men's ice hockey left wingers
American people of Norwegian descent
Bemidji State Beavers men's ice hockey players
Broome Dusters players
Cincinnati Stingers players
Hampton Gulls (SHL) players
Ice hockey players from Minnesota
Indianapolis Racers players
Long Beach Sharks players
Los Angeles Blades (PHL) players
New England Whalers players
Oklahoma City Blazers (1965–1977) players
People from Bemidji, Minnesota
Rhode Island Reds players
Saginaw Gears players
Toronto Maple Leafs draft picks
Toronto Maple Leafs players
Tulsa Oilers (1964–1984) players
Tucson Rustlers players